Manufacturing in Puerto Rico is the largest economic sector in the economy of Puerto Rico; composing almost half (about 46%) of the gross domestic product (GDP) of Puerto Rico. All manufacturers in Puerto Rico are in some way interconnected with the Puerto Rico Industrial Development Company (PRIDCO) which provides substantial incentives for companies that manufacture in Puerto Rico. Manufacturers are also voluntarily interconnected through the Puerto Rico Manufacturers Association which serves as their primary trade association and their main lobby group upon the Legislative Assembly of Puerto Rico. Most manufacturing in Puerto Rico today is the product of Operation Bootstrap.

History

Advantages
 governed by the law and regulations of the federal government of the United States, including the Environmental Protection Agency (EPA), U.S. labor laws, and the Occupational Safety and Health Act (OSHA)
 bilingual labor force that speaks and writes Spanish and English
 labor force enjoys the rights and privileges of American citizenship, allowing defense contractors to base operations in Puerto Rico or use Puerto Rico force for nearshoring
 shorter route point from Africa and South America

Disadvantages
 government monopolies on public utilities and worker's compensation
 high level of government corruption
 additional laws and regulation than those imposed by the federal government of the United States

 
+Puerto